George Buist may refer to:

 George Buist (footballer) (1883–?), English footballer
 George Buist (journalist) (1805–1860), Scottish journalist and scientist
 George Buist (minister) (1779–1860), Scottish minister of the Church of Scotland